Chad Meredith Hurley (born January 24, 1977) is an American webmaster and businessman who serves as the advisor and former chief executive officer (CEO) of YouTube. He also co-founded MixBit. In June 2006, he was voted 28th on Business 2.0's "50 People Who Matter Now" list. In October 2006, he and Steve Chen sold YouTube for $1.65 billion to Google. Hurley worked in eBay's PayPal division—one of his tasks involved designing the original PayPal logo—before co-founding YouTube with fellow PayPal colleagues Steve Chen and Jawed Karim. Hurley was primarily responsible for the tagging and video-sharing aspects of YouTube.

Early life and education
Hurley was born in Reading, Pennsylvania, the second child of Don and Joann Hurley, and grew up near Birdsboro, Pennsylvania. He has an older sister, Heather, and a younger brother, Brent.

Since childhood, Hurley showed interest in the arts, and became interested in computers and electronic media during high school. He was a standout runner for Twin Valley High School's cross-country program, which won two of its PIAA State titles with him as a member in 1992 and 1994. He was also a member of the Technology Student Association during high school. He graduated from Twin Valley High School in 1995 and earned a B.A. in Fine Art from Indiana University of Pennsylvania in 1999.

Career

YouTube

Hurley founded YouTube in 2005 with Steve Chen and Jawed Karim. On October 16, 2006, Chen and Hurley sold YouTube to Google Inc. for $1.65 billion. It was reported in The Wall Street Journal that Hurley's share was $345.6M at Google's February 7, 2007 closing stock price of $470.01. He received 694,087 Google shares directly and another 41,232 shares in a trust.

YouTube's other two co-founders, Steve Chen and Jawed Karim, received 625,366 shares and 137,443 shares, respectively valued at $326.2M and $64.6M. The Journals report was based on Google's registration statement with SEC filed on February 7, 2007.

Hurley stepped down as CEO of YouTube in October 2010 and stated he would stay on as an advisor of YouTube, allowing Salar Kamangar to take over the CEO position.

MixBit 
In August 2013, Hurley launched another company called MixBit which does video editing using smartphones. According to Steve Chen, it was Chad's idea to turn Avos into MixBit even before the inception of YouTube.

The app resembles other famous short-video recording smartphone apps such as Vine, Instagram and Vyclone. Its limit of recording stretches up to 256 clips, and each clip can be maximum 16 seconds long. It also features the editing tools similar to its other competitor apps.

Formula One 
Hurley was involved as a major investor with US F1 Team, one of the new entrants in Formula One automobile racing for the 2010 season. On March 2, 2010, the team's personnel were dismissed from their duties and the team was unofficially shut down. Neither Hurley, team principal Ken Anderson nor sporting director Peter Windsor would comment on the team's failure to make it to the grid.

Investments 
Hurley has made several investments. He is a part-owner of the NBA's Golden State Warriors and the MLS' Los Angeles Football Club.

On the January 25, 2021, Hurley announced on Twitter that he had become an investor at Leeds United, the English Premier League football club.

Personal life 
Hurley was formerly married to Kathy Clark, the daughter of Silicon Valley entrepreneur James H. Clark. They were divorced in 2012. Hurley remarried in 2020 to Elise Walden.

References

External links 

1977 births
American businesspeople in the online media industry
American computer businesspeople
American technology company founders
Formula E people
Google employees
Internet pioneers
Living people
People from Birdsboro, Pennsylvania
People from Palo Alto, California
PayPal people
YouTube
YouTube channels launched in 2005
Indiana University of Pennsylvania alumni